Einar Ágústsson (23 September 1922 – 12 April 1986) was an Icelandic politician and minister. His son Sigurður become CEO and then chairman of the bank Kaupþing in the years leading up to its 2008 collapse.

External links 

 Non auto-biography of Einar Ágústsson on the parliament website

1922 births
1986 deaths
Einar Agustsson